Boo Hoo is the third studio album by Cuban American dark cabaret musician Aurelio Voltaire, released on May 14, 2002, through Projekt Records. According to Voltaire, he began writing songs for the album after his then-girlfriend broke up with him; dealing with it in a sometimes satirical and irreverent, sometimes introspective and sentimental manner, most of the album's songs are about loss, heartbreak, remorse and attempts to overcome her.

The only tracks unrelated to the album's concept of heartbreak are "BRAINS!", a song that Voltaire originally wrote for The Grim Adventures of Billy & Mandy episode "Little Rock of Horrors"; "Graveyard Picnic", a tribute to Edgar Allan Poe and his works; "Bachelorette" and "Caught a Lite Sneeze", covers of Björk and Tori Amos, respectively; and "The Vampire Club", a light satire about the goth subculture. A new version of "The Vampire Club", re-written to satirize the Twilight books and films, would appear on his 2010 compilation Spooky Songs for Creepy Kids.

Track listing

Personnel
 Voltaire — vocals, acoustic guitar
 Gregor Kitzis — violin
 Matthew Goeke — cello
 George Grant — bass, vocals
 Stephen Moses — drums, trombone

References

External links
 Voltaire's official website
 Boo Hoo on Projekt Records' official website

Voltaire (musician) albums
Projekt Records albums
2002 albums